Emily Fragos is an American poet. She was a Witter Bynner Fellow, and Guggenheim Fellow.

Life
She graduated from Syracuse University, Paris-Sorbonne University, and Columbia University.

She teaches at New York University, and Columbia University.

Her work has appeared in Ploughshares, BOMB, Boston Review, and Paris Review.

Works
 Hostage, Sheep Meadow,  2011,

References

External links

American poets
New York University faculty
Columbia University faculty
Syracuse University alumni
Paris-Sorbonne University alumni
Columbia University School of the Arts alumni
Living people
Place of birth missing (living people)
Year of birth missing (living people)